The Revere Bell was a gift to Singapore by Mrs. Maria Revere Balestier, the daughter of Paul Revere and wife of the first American Consul to Singapore, Joseph Balestier. Cast by the Revere Copper Company in Boston, Massachusetts, it is the only Revere bell outside the United States. Maria Revere presented the bell to the first Church of St. Andrew in 1843 on condition that it be used to sound a curfew for five minutes at 8:00 pm every night. The curfew bell rang until 1855 when the church was demolished, and was resumed when the second church (which became St. Andrew's Cathedral later) was constructed in its place in 1861 until it was permanently discontinued in 1874.

On 6 February 1889, the Revere Bell was replaced by a new peal of bells presented by the family of Captain J. S. H. Fraser. The bell was put into storage until 1911, when it was installed in St. George's Garrison Church in Tanglin Barracks. However, after it became irreparably cracked it was moved to a Royal Engineers storeyard. The Raffles Museum, now the National Museum of Singapore, learned of the bell in September 1937, and took custody of it after the Anglican Archdeacon of Singapore, Graham White, donated it to the museum.

Since then the Revere Bell has been displayed the National Museum, apart from a period between January 1997 and May 2006 when the bell was loaned to the United States Embassy in Singapore while the museum was being renovated. During that time it was showcased behind velvet ropes in the foyer of the Embassy. The bell, now in the museum's Singapore History Gallery, has been called a symbol of the friendship between the peoples of Singapore and the United States.

See also
Balestier Road
Revere bells

References

Further reading

Collections of the National Museum of Singapore
History of Singapore
Individual bells